Kam Za Mung (also spelt Kan Zar Mon or Kanzar Mone) is a Burmese politician who currently serves as Minister of Agriculture, Livestock and Irrigation  for Sagaing Region and MP for Kalay Township No. 2 constituency.

Political career 
In the 2015 Myanmar general election, he was elected as a Sagaing Region Hluttaw MP, from Kalay  Township No.2  parliamentary constituency. He also serving as a Regional minister of Agriculture, Livestock and Irrigation for Sagaing Region.

References

National League for Democracy politicians
Living people
People from Sagaing Region
Year of birth missing (living people)